Secunderabad–Dhone section is an electrified single-track railway section in Hyderabad railway division of South Central Railway zone. It connects Hyderabad of Telangana with Dhone in Andhra Pradesh. The section is a part of Train Collison Avoidance System.project

History 
This line construction was started in 1922 and completed in 1929 as a metre-gauge railway line during British era. This metre-gauge line was converted into broad-gauge railway line in between 1993 and 1998. As of March 2023, electrification is in progress from Gadwal to Kurnool.

Route 

References 

5 ft 6 in gauge railways in India
Rail transport in Andhra Pradesh
Railway lines opened in 1932
1922 establishments in India